John Anthony White (born July 9, 1975), is an American musician, singer, songwriter, and music producer, best known as the lead singer and guitarist of the duo The White Stripes. White has enjoyed consistent critical and popular success and is widely credited as one of the key artists in the garage rock revival of the 2000s. He has won 12 Grammy Awards, and three of his solo albums have reached number one on the Billboard charts. Rolling Stone ranked him number 70 on its 2010 list of "The 100 Greatest Guitarists of All Time". David Fricke's 2010 list ranked him at number 17. In 2012, the New York Times called White "the coolest, weirdest and savviest rockstar of our time".

After moonlighting in several underground Detroit bands as a drummer, White founded the White Stripes with fellow Detroit native and then-wife Meg White in 1997. Their 2001 breakthrough album, White Blood Cells, brought them international fame with the hit single and accompanying music video "Fell in Love with a Girl". This recognition provided White opportunities to collaborate with famous artists, including Loretta Lynn and Bob Dylan. In 2005, White founded the Raconteurs with Brendan Benson, and in 2009 founded the Dead Weather with Alison Mosshart of the Kills. In 2008, he recorded "Another Way to Die" (the title song for the 2008 James Bond film Quantum of Solace) with Alicia Keys, making them the only duet to perform a Bond song. White has released four solo studio albums, which have garnered wide critical and commercial success.

White is a board member of the Library of Congress' National Recording Preservation Foundation. His record label and studio Third Man Records releases vinyl recordings of his own work as well as that of other artists and local school children. His second studio album, Lazaretto (2014), holds the record for most first-week vinyl sales since 1991. White has an extensive collection of guitars and other instruments and has a preference for vintage items that often have connections to famous blues artists. He is a vocal advocate for analog technology and recording techniques.

White values his privacy and has been known to create misdirection about his personal life. He and Meg White married in 1996, but divorced in 2000 before the height of the band's fame. They then began calling themselves siblings. He was later married to model and singer Karen Elson from 2005 to 2013; they have a son and daughter. He currently resides in Nashville, Tennessee.

Early life 
John Anthony Gillis was born in Detroit, Michigan, on July 9, 1975, the youngest of ten children of Teresa (née Bandyk; born 1930) and Gorman M. Gillis. His mother's family was Polish, while his father was Scottish-Canadian. He was raised a Catholic, and his father and mother both worked for the Archdiocese of Detroit as the building maintenance superintendent and secretary in the Cardinal's office, respectively. Gillis became an altar boy, which landed him an uncredited role in the 1987 movie The Rosary Murders, filmed mainly at Most Holy Redeemer parish in southwest Detroit. He attended Cass Technical High School in Detroit.

Gillis' early musical influences were his older brothers, who were in a band together called Catalyst, and he learned to play the instruments they abandoned; he began playing the drums in the first grade after finding a kit in the attic. As a child, he was a fan of classical music, but in elementary school, he began listening to the Doors, Pink Floyd, and Led Zeppelin. As a "shorthaired [teenager] with braces", Gillis began listening to the blues and 1960s rock that would influence him in the White Stripes, with Son House and Blind Willie McTell being among his favorite blues guitarists. He has said in interviews that Son House's "Grinnin' in Your Face" is his favorite song of all time. As a drummer, his heroes include Gene Krupa, Stewart Copeland, and Crow Smith from Flat Duo Jets.

In 2005, on 60 Minutes, he told Mike Wallace that his life could have turned out differently. "I'd got accepted to a seminary in Wisconsin, and I was gonna become a priest, but at the last second I thought, 'I'll just go to public school.' I had just gotten a new amplifier in my bedroom, and I didn't think I was allowed to take it with me." Instead, he got accepted into Cass Technical High School as a business major, and played the drums and trombone in the band. At 15, he began a three-year upholstery apprenticeship with a family friend, Brian Muldoon. He credits Muldoon with exposing him to punk music as they worked together in the shop. Muldoon goaded his young apprentice into forming a band: "He played drums", Gillis thought. "Well I guess I'll play guitar then." The two recorded an album, Makers of High Grade Suites, as the Upholsterers.

As a senior in high school, he met Megan White at the Memphis Smoke restaurant where she worked, and they frequented the coffee shops, local music venues, and record stores of the area. After a courtship, they got married on September 21, 1996. In a reversal of tradition, he legally took her last name.

After completing his apprenticeship, he started a one-man business of his own, Third Man Upholstery. The slogan of his business was "Your Furniture's Not Dead" and the color scheme was yellow and black—including a yellow van, a yellow-and-black uniform, and a yellow clipboard. Although Third Man Upholstery never lacked business, he claims it was unprofitable due to his complacency about money and his business practices that were perceived as unprofessional, including making bills out in crayon and writing poetry inside the furniture.

Career

The White Stripes 

At 19 years old, Jack had landed his first professional gig as the drummer for the Detroit band Goober & the Peas, and was still in that position when the band broke up in 1996. It was in this band that he learned about touring and performing onstage. After the band's split, he settled into working as an upholsterer by day while moonlighting in local bands, as well as performing solo shows. Though a bartender by trade, Meg began to learn to play the drums in 1997 and, according to Jack, "When she started to play drums with me, just on a lark, it felt liberating and refreshing." The couple became a band, calling themselves the White Stripes, and two months later performed their first show at the Gold Dollar in Detroit.

Despite being married, Jack and Meg publicly presented themselves as siblings. They kept to a chromatic theme, dressing only in red, white, and black. They began their career as part of Michigan's underground garage rock music scene. They played along with and opened for more established local bands such as Bantam Rooster, the Dirtbombs, Two-Star Tabernacle, Rocket 455, and the Hentchmen. In 1998, the White Stripes were signed to Italy Records—a small and independent Detroit-based garage punk label—by Dave Buick. The band released its eponymous debut album in 1999, and a year later the album was followed up by the cult classic, De Stijl. The album eventually peaked at number 38 in Billboards Independent Albums chart.

In 2001, the band released White Blood Cells. The album's stripped-down garage rock sound drew critical acclaim in the US and beyond, making the White Stripes one of the more acclaimed bands of 2002, and forefront figures in the garage band revival of the time. John Peel, an influential DJ and the band's early advocate in the UK, said they were the most exciting thing he'd heard since Jimi Hendrix. The New York Times said of White, "beneath the arty facade lies one of the most cagey, darkly original rockers to come along since Kurt Cobain." The album was followed up in 2003 by the commercially and critically successful Elephant. The critic at AllMusic wrote that the album "sounds even more pissed-off, paranoid and stunning than its predecessor ... darker and more difficult than White Blood Cells". The album's first single, "Seven Nation Army", became the band's signature song, reaching number one on the Billboard Modern Rock Tracks chart for three weeks, winning the 2004 Grammy Award for Best Rock Song, and becoming an international sporting and protest anthem. The band's fifth album, Get Behind Me Satan, was recorded in White's own home and marked a change in the band's musical direction, with piano-driven melodies and experimentation with marimba and a more rhythm-based guitar playing by White.

The band's sixth album, Icky Thump, was released in 2007, and unlike their previous lo-fi albums, it was recorded in Nashville at Blackbird Studio. The album was regarded as a return to the band's earlier blues and garage-rock sound. It debuted at number two on the US Billboard 200 chart, and entered the UK Albums Chart at number one, selling over 300,000 vinyl copies in England alone. Of his excitement for vinyl, White explained, "We can't afford to lose the feeling of cracking open a new record and looking at large artwork and having something you can hold in your hands." In support of the album, they launched a Canadian tour, in which they played a gig in every one of the country's provinces and territories. However, later that year, the band announced the cancellation of 18 tour dates due to Meg's struggle with acute anxiety. A few days later, the duo canceled the remainder of their 2007 UK tour dates as well.

White worked with other artists in the meantime, but revealed the band's plan to release a seventh album by the summer of 2009. On February 20, 2009—and on the final episode of Late Night with Conan O'Brien—the band made their first live appearance after the cancellation of the tour, and a documentary about their Canadian tour—titled The White Stripes: Under Great White Northern Lights—debuted later that year at the Toronto International Film Festival. However, almost two years passed with no new releases, and on February 2, 2011, the band reported on their official website that they were disbanding. White emphasized that it was not due to health issues or artistic differences, "but mostly to preserve what is beautiful and special about the band".

The Raconteurs 

In 2005, while collaborating with Brendan Benson—a fellow Michigan native whom White had worked with before—they composed a song called "Steady, as She Goes". This inspired them to create a full band, and they invited Jack Lawrence and Patrick Keeler of the Greenhornes to join them in what would become the Raconteurs. The musicians met in Benson's home studio in Detroit and, for the remainder of the year, they recorded when time allowed. The result was the band's debut album, Broken Boy Soldiers. Reaching the Top Ten charts in both the US and the UK, it was nominated for Best Rock Album at the 2006 Grammy Awards. The lead single, "Steady, As She Goes" was nominated for Best Rock Performance by a Duo or Group with Vocal. The Raconteurs set out on tour to support the album, including eight dates as the opening act for Bob Dylan. The group's second album, Consolers of the Lonely, and its first single, "Salute Your Solution", were released simultaneously in 2008. The album reached number seven on the Billboard 200 chart, and received a Grammy nomination for Best Rock Album. The group rebanded to create the new album Help Us Stranger in 2019. This release was followed by a US tour.

The Dead Weather 

While on tour to promote Consolers of the Lonely, White developed bronchitis and often lost his voice. Alison Mosshart, the frontwoman for the Kills (who was touring with the Raconteurs at the time) would often fill in as his vocal replacement. The chemistry between the two artists led them to collaborate, and in early 2009, White formed a new group called the Dead Weather. Mosshart sang, White played drums and shared vocal duties, Jack Lawrence of the Raconteurs played bass, and the Queens of the Stone Age keyboardist and guitarist Dean Fertita rounded out the four-piece.

The group debuted a handful of new tracks on March 11, 2009, in Nashville from their debut album Horehound. It came out on July 13, 2009, in Europe and July 14, 2009, in North America on White's Third Man Records label. In October 2009, Mosshart confirmed that the second album was "halfway done", and the first single, "Die by the Drop", was released on March 30, 2010. The new album (again on the Third Man Records label) was titled Sea of Cowards and was released on May 7 of that year in Ireland, on May 10 in the United Kingdom, and on May 11 in the U.S.

Announcement of their third album, Dodge & Burn, was made in July 2015 for a worldwide release in September by Third Man Records. Along with four previously released tracks, remixed and remastered, the album features eight new songs.

Solo career 
White's popular and critical success with the White Stripes opened up opportunities for him to collaborate as a solo artist with other musicians. He has joined other artists on their recordings, as well as invited artists to perform on his projects. He has also worked as a producer for various artists, often through his label, Third Man Records.

Rumors began to circulate in 2003 that White had collaborated with Electric Six for their song "Danger! High Voltage". He and the Electric Six both denied this, and the vocal work was credited officially to John S O'Leary. In subsequent interviews with Chris Handyside, however, Dick Valentine and Corey Martin (Electric Six band members) acknowledged White's involvement and confirmed that he received no payment.

White worked with Loretta Lynn on her 2004 album Van Lear Rose, which he produced and performed on. The album was a critical and commercial success. In 2008, White collaborated with Alicia Keys on the song "Another Way to Die", the theme song for the James Bond film Quantum of Solace. In 2009, Jack White was featured in It Might Get Loud, a film in which he, Jimmy Page, and the Edge come together to discuss the electric guitar and each artist's different playing methods. White's first solo single, "Fly Farm Blues", was written and recorded in 10 minutes during the filming of the movie that August. The single went on sale as a 7-inch vinyl record from Third Man Records and as a digital single available through iTunes on August 11, 2010. In November 2010, producer Danger Mouse announced that White—along with Norah Jones—had been recruited for his collaboration with Daniele Luppi entitled Rome. White provided vocals to three songs on the album: "The Rose with the Broken Neck", "Two Against One", and "The World". White finished and performed the song "You Know That I Know", and it was featured on The Lost Notebooks of Hank Williams, released on October 4, 2011. In that same year, he produced and played on Wanda Jackson's album The Party Ain't Over. To her delight, his studio also released the album on a 7-inch vinyl. White also appeared on AHK-toong BAY-bi Covered, performing a cover of U2's "Love Is Blindness". White has worked with other artists as well, including Beck, the Rolling Stones, Jeff Beck, Bob Dylan, and Insane Clown Posse.

On January 30, 2012, White released "Love Interruption" as the first single off his debut, self-produced solo album, Blunderbuss, which was released on April 24, 2012. The album ultimately debuted number one on the Billboard 200 chart, and in support of the album, he appeared on Saturday Night Live as the musical guest and played at select festivals during the summer of 2012, including the Firefly Music Festival, Radio 1's Hackney Weekend, the Sasquatch! Music Festival, the Fuji Rock Festival in Japan (one of the biggest festivals in the world), and Rock Werchter in Belgium. Later in the year, he headlined Austin City Limits Music Festival. During his tour for the album, White employed two live bands, which he alternated between at random. The first, called the Peacocks, was all female and consisted of Ruby Amanfu, Carla Azar, Lillie Mae Rische, Maggie Björklund, Brooke Waggoner, and alternating bassists Bryn Davies and Catherine Popper. The other, the Buzzards, was all male and consisted of Daru Jones, Dominic Davis, Fats Kaplin, Ikey Owens, and Cory Younts. White said maintaining two bands was too expensive, and abandoned the practice at the conclusion of the tour. Blunderbuss was ultimately nominated for several Grammys, including Album of the Year, Best Rock Album, and Best Rock Song for "Freedom at 21".

On April 1, 2014, White announced his second solo album, Lazaretto, inspired by plays and poetry he had written as a teen. It was released on June 10, 2014, simultaneously with the first single off the album, "High Ball Stepper". The album debuted at number one on the Billboard 200 chart and, in a personal triumph for White, broke the record for the largest sales week for a vinyl album since SoundScan began tracking sales in 1991. The album was widely praised among critics, and was nominated for three Grammy Awards: Best Alternative Music Album, as well as Best Rock Song and Best Rock Performance (for the song "Lazaretto"). During the supporting tour, he performed the longest show of his career on July 30, 2014, at the Detroit Masonic Temple, and later performed as one of the headliners at the Coachella Festival over two weekends in April 2015. On April 14, 2015, White announced that the festival would be his last electric set, followed by one acoustic show in each of the five U.S. states he had yet to perform in, before he would be taking a prolonged break from live performances. However, he performed on the inaugural episode of the radio show A Prairie Home Companion with the new host Chris Thile, on October 15, 2016, in support of his compilation album Acoustic Recordings 1998–2016. He co-wrote the song "Don't Hurt Yourself " with Beyoncé on her album Lemonade, and accompanied her on the vocals.

Ahead of his next effort, White worked in isolation and without a cell phone; he rented an apartment in Nashville, recorded quietly so no one would know what he was working on, and slept on an army cot. He drew inspiration from rap artists of the 1980s and 1990s (as well as A Tribe Called Quest, Kanye West, and Nicki Minaj), and chose his backing musicians from talent that played supporting hip hop artists live. On December 12, 2017, he released a four-minute video titled "Servings and Portions from my Boarding House Reach", which featured short sound bites of new music interspersed with white noise. In January 2018, White released "Connected by Love", taken from his third solo album Boarding House Reach, which was released on March 23, 2018. Like its two preceding albums, it landed at number one on the Billboard 200 chart. In promotion of his album, White appeared on The Tonight Show Starring Jimmy Fallon and on Saturday Night Live as the musical guest, where he played "Over and Over and Over" and "Connected by Love". White released Jack White: Kneeling at The Anthem D.C., his first concert film as a solo artist, on September 21, 2018, exclusively on Amazon Prime Video.

In October 2021, White released "Taking Me Back", his first solo single since 2018, which appeared in the game Call of Duty: Vanguard. In November, White revealed that he would release two solo albums in 2022: Fear of the Dawn, which will feature White's traditional rock sound, on April 8, and Entering Heaven Alive, a folk album, on July 22. White also released a video for "Taking Me Back" on November 11. Together, the albums were named the dual number one album of the year by Rough Trade UK. In December 2021, White announced the Supply Chain Issues Tour kicking off on April 8, 2022, in Detroit, Michigan. The tour covers North America and Europe.

White performed on Saturday Night Live on February 25, 2023. He played two songs from his Fear of the Dawn album and was presented with a jacket for being a Fiver-Timer on the show.

Acting 
White has also had a minor acting career. He appeared in the 2003 film Cold Mountain as a character named Georgia and performed five songs for the Cold Mountain soundtrack: "Sittin' on Top of the World", "Wayfaring Stranger", "Never Far Away", "Christmas Time Soon Will Be Over" and "Great High Mountain". The 2003 Jim Jarmusch film Coffee and Cigarettes featured both Jack and Meg in the segment "Jack Shows Meg His Tesla Coil". He also played Elvis Presley in the 2007 satire Walk Hard. In 2016, he appeared as a special guest on the season one finale of The Muppets, and sang "You Are the Sunshine of My Life", which he later released on 7-inch vinyl. In June 2017, White appeared in the award-winning documentary film The American Epic Sessions, recording on the first electrical sound recording system from the 1920s. His performances of "Matrimonial Intentions", "Mama's Angel Child", "2 Fingers of Whiskey (with Elton John) and "On the Road Again' and "One Mic" (with Nas) appeared on Music from The American Epic Sessions: Original Motion Picture Soundtrack. He was an executive producer of the film.

Third Man Records 

White co-founded Third Man Records in 2001 with Ben Swank, formerly of the Ohio-based Soledad Brothers band. However, it was not until after he moved to Nashville that White purchased a space in 2009 to house his label. He explained, "For the longest time I did not want to have my own studio gear, mostly because with the White Stripes I wanted to have the constriction of going into a studio and having a set time of 10 days or two weeks to finish an album, and using whatever gear they happen to have there. After 10 to 15 years of recording like that I felt that it was finally time for me to have my own place to produce music, and have exactly what I want in there: the exact tape machines, the exact microphones, the exact amplifiers that I like, and so on." Using the slogan "Your Turntable's Not Dead", Third Man also presses vinyl records, for the artists on its label, for White's own musical ventures, as well as for third parties for hire.

In March 2015, Third Man joined in the launch of TIDAL, a music streaming service that Jay-Z purchased and co-owns with other major music artists. Later that year, White partnered with the watch manufacturer Shinola to open a retail location in Detroit.

Artistry

Instruments and equipment 
White owns many instruments and, historically, has tended to use certain ones for specific projects or in certain settings. He has a preference for vintage guitars, many of which are associated with influential blues artists. Much of his equipment is custom-made, for both technical and aesthetic reasons. White is a proficient guitar, bass, mandolin, percussion and piano player.

During his career with the White Stripes, White principally used three guitars, though he used others as well. The red, "JB Hutto", Airline guitar was a vintage 1964 model originally distributed by Montgomery Ward department store. Though used by several artists, White's attachment to the instrument raised its popularity to the extent that Eastwood Guitars began producing a modified replica around 2000. The 1950s-era Kay Hollowbody was a gift from his brother in return for a favor. It was the same brand of electric guitar made popular by Howlin' Wolf, and White most famously used it on "Seven Nation Army". He began using a 1915 Gibson L-1 acoustic (often called the Robert Johnson model) on the Icky Thump album; in an interview for Gibson, he called the instrument his favorite. He also used a three-pickup Airline Town & Country (later featured in the "Steady As She Goes" music video), a Harmony Rocket, a 1970s-era Crestwood Astral II, and what would become the first of three custom Gretsch Rancher Falcon acoustic guitars. While with the Stripes, any equipment that did not match their red/black/white color scheme was painted red.

On Black Friday in 2013, Third Man Records diversified and launched the Bumble Buzz pedal an octave fuzz built for Third Man by Vancouver, British Columbia’s Union Tube and Transistor. In 2014 the pedal was reviewed by Premier Guitar, and is found in Jack's pedal setup.

While the Raconteurs were still in development, White commissioned luthier Randy Parsons to create what White called the Triple Jet—a custom guitar styled after the Duo Jet double-cutaway guitar. Parsons's first product was painted copper color, however he decided to create a second version with a completely copper body, which White began to use instead. For the Raconteurs first tour, White also played a Gretsch Anniversary Jr. with a Bigsby vibrato tailpiece and three Filtertron pickups. He later added a custom Gretsch Anniversary Jr. with two cutaways, a lever-activated mute system, a built-in and retractable bullet microphone, and a light-activated theremin next to the Bigsby. White has dubbed this one the "Green Machine", and it is featured in It Might Get Loud. He sometimes played a Gibson J-160E, a Gretsch Duo Jet in Cadillac Green, and a second Gretsch Rancher acoustic guitar. For the Raconteurs' 2008 tour, he had Analog Man plate all of his pedals in copper. In 2020 White completed his Three-Wheel-Motion Low Rider - which is a highly customized Fender Telecaster B-Bender guitar.

He has since acquired another Gretsch, a custom white "Billy Bo" Jupiter Thunderbird with a gold double pickguard (as seen in the music video for "Another Way to Die"). White found a 1957 Gretsch G6134 White Penguin in 2007 while on tour in Texas—the same one he used in the music video for "Icky Thump"—which ultimately fit in with the Dead Weather's color scheme. He also uses a black left-handed one since the Dead Weather album Sea of Cowards came out. He has also been known to play Fender Telecasters, featuring one in the music video for Loretta Lynn's "Portland, Oregon".

White owns three Gretsch Rancher Falcons because he says that its bass tones make it his favorite acoustic to play live. They are collectively referred to as his "girlfriends", as each one has an image of a classic movie star on the back. Claudette Colbert is the brunette he used while with the Stripes, Rita Hayworth is the redhead he acquired with the Raconteurs, and Veronica Lake is the blonde he added in 2010 while with the Dead Weather.

Since 2018, White has been playing EVH Wolfgang guitars, which are Eddie Van Halen's signature model.

White uses numerous effects to create his live sound, most notably a DigiTech Whammy WH-4 to create the rapid modulations in pitch he uses in his solos. White also produces a "fake" bass tone by playing the Kay Hollowbody and JB Hutto Montgomery Airline guitars through a Whammy IV set to one octave down for a very thick, low, rumbling sound, which he uses most notably on the song "Seven Nation Army". He also uses an MXR Micro Amp and custom Electro-Harmonix Big Muff Distortion/Sustainer. In 2005, for the single "Blue Orchid", White employed an Electro-Harmonix Polyphonic Octave Generator (POG), which let him mix in several octave effects into one along with the dry signal. He plugs this setup into a 1970s Fender Twin Reverb "Silverface" and two 100-Watt Sears Silvertone 1485 6×10 amplifiers. He also used a 1960s Fender Twin Reverb "Blackface".

On occasion, White also plays other instruments, such as a Black Gibson F-4 mandolin ("Little Ghost"), piano (on most tracks from Get Behind Me Satan, and various others), and an electric piano on such tracks as "The Air Near My Fingers" and "I'm Finding it Harder to be a Gentleman". White also plays percussion instruments such as the marimba (as on "The Nurse"), drums and tambourine. For the White Stripes' 2007 tour, he played a custom-finish Hammond A-100 organ with a Leslie 3300 speaker, which was subsequently loaned to Bob Dylan, and currently resides at Third Man Studios. On the album Broken Boy Soldiers, both he and Benson are credited with playing the album's synths and organ.

With the Dead Weather, White plays a custom Ludwig Classic Maple kit in Black Oyster Pearl. Notably, it includes two-snare drums, which White calls "the jazz canon". For the 2009 Full Flash Blank tour, White used a drum head with the Three Brides of Dracula on the front, but in 2010, White employed a new drum head, upon the release of Sea of Cowards, which has an image of The Third Man himself: Harry Lime attempting to escape certain capture in the sewers of Vienna. During the American leg of the 2010 tour, White switched his drum head again featuring a picture of himself in the guise he wore on the cover of Sea of Cowards. This drum head is called Sam Kay by some fans, referring to the insert inside of the 12" LP.

Minimalist style 

White has long been a proponent of analog equipment and the associated working methods. Beginning in the fifth grade, he and his childhood friend, Dominic Suchyta, would listen to records in White's attic on weekends and began to record cover songs on an old four-track reel-to-reel tape machine. The White Stripes' first album was largely recorded in the attic of his parents' home. As their fame grew beyond Detroit, the Stripes became known for their affected innocence and stripped-down playing style. In particular, White became distinguished for his nasal vocal delivery and loose, explosive guitar delivery. In an early New York Times concert review from 2001, Ann Powers said that, while White's playing was "ingenious", he "created more challenges by playing an acoustic guitar with paper taped over the hole and a less-than-high-quality solid body electric".

His home studio in Nashville contains two rooms ("I want everyone close, focused, feeling like we're in it together.") with two pieces of equipment: a Neve mixing console, and two Studer A800 2-inch 8-track tape recorders.

In his introduction in the documentary film, It Might Get Loud, White showcases his minimalist style by constructing a guitar built out of a plank of wood, three nails, a glass Coke bottle, a guitar string, and a pickup. He ends the demonstration by saying, "Who says you need to buy a guitar?" In a 2012 episode of the show, Portlandia, White made a cameo in a sketch spoofing home studio enthusiasts who prefer antique recording equipment.

Reception 
White has enjoyed both critical and commercial success, and is widely credited as one of the key artists in the garage rock revival of the 2000s. Rolling Stone ranked him number 70 on its 2010 list of "The 100 Greatest Guitarists of All Time". David Fricke's 2011 list ranked him at number 17. He has won twelve Grammy Awards, with 33 nominations, and three solo albums have reached number one on the Billboard charts. Interviewers note the wide breadth of the music styles and eras he draws from for inspiration. In May 2015, the Music City Walk of Fame announced that it would be honoring White (along with Loretta Lynn) with a medallion at its re-opening in Nashville. On February 8, 2017, White was the honoree of the Producers and Engineers Wing of the Recording Academy during the annual Grammy Week celebration for his commitment "to working diligently to ensure that the quality and integrity of recorded music are captured and preserved".

Much has been made of White's "showmanship" and affectations. Since the beginning, critics have debated the "riddle" of White's self-awareness against his claims of authenticity, with people falling on both sides of the issue. Joe Hagan of The New York Times asked in 2001, "Is Mr. White, a 25-year-old former upholsterer from southwest Detroit, concocting this stuff with a wink? Or are the White Stripes simply naïve?" Alexis Petridis, of The Guardian, said that White "makes for an enigmatic figure. Not because he's particularly difficult or guarded, but simply because what he tells you suggests a lifelong penchant for inscrutable behavior." White himself confesses, "Sometimes I think I'm a simple guy, but I think the reality is I'm really complicated, as simple as I wish I was."

Personal life 
White is protective of his privacy and gives few details of his family life, even going as far as to disseminate false information. He states that he does not consider his personal life relevant to his art, saying "It's the same thing as asking Michelangelo, 'What kind of shoes do you wear?' ... In the end, it doesn't really matter ... the only thing that's going to be left is our records and photos."

His collection of esoterica include Lead Belly's New York City arrest record, James Brown's Georgia driver's license from the 1980s, and a copy of the first Superman comic from June 1938. For $300,000 in January 2015, an online bidder won an auction for Elvis Presley's first recording ever—an acetate of the two cover songs: "My Happiness" and "That's When Your Heartaches Begin". In its edition of March 6, 2015, Billboard magazine announced the buyer had been White. The vinyl record was recorded at Sun Studio in Memphis, Tennessee in the summer of 1953 when Presley was 18 years old.

Raised in Detroit, White is a fan of the Detroit Tigers baseball team.

On multiple occasions, he has decried video games as being useless and a waste of time, going so far as to state that he doesn't allow his kids to play them. Despite this, his songs have appeared in the trailers for Call of Duty: Vanguard, Call of Duty: Advanced Warfare, and Battlefield 1, and on the soundtracks of Forza Horizon 4 and numerous Guitar Hero games.

Relationships 

Jack and Meg married on September 21, 1996, and divorced on March 24, 2000. Jack took Meg's last name, legally changing his surname. After the White Stripes broke up, he mentions he "almost never talks to Meg", adding that she has been solitary. In 2003, he had a brief relationship with actress Renée Zellweger, whom he met during the filming of Cold Mountain. That summer, the couple were in a car accident in which White broke his left index finger and was forced to reschedule much of the summer tour. He posted the footage of his finger surgery on the web for fans. White and Zellweger's breakup became public in December 2004.

White met British model Karen Elson when she appeared in the White Stripes' music video for "Blue Orchid". They married on June 1, 2005, in Manaus, Brazil. The wedding took place in a canoe on the Amazon River and was officiated by a shaman. A Roman Catholic priest later convalidated their marriage. Manager Ian Montone was the best man and Meg White was the maid of honor. Official wedding announcements stated that "it was the first marriage" for both. In 2006, the couple had a daughter, Scarlett Teresa. Their second child, son Henry Lee, was born in 2007.

The family resided in Brentwood, a suburb south of Nashville, where Elson managed a vintage clothing store called Venus & Mars. Elson provided vocals on White's first solo record. The couple announced their intention to divorce in June 2011, throwing "a positive swing bang humdinger" party to commemorate the split. On July 22, 2013, a Nashville judge barred White from having "any contact with Karen Elson whatsoever except as it relates to parenting time with the parties' minor children". A counter-motion was filed on August 2, 2013, stating that "The reason for filing this response is that Mr. White does not want to be portrayed as something he is not, violent toward his wife and children." The divorce was finalized on November 26, 2013. Elson later recanted the charges, attributing the "aggressive" proceedings to her divorce attorneys, and saying "those who gain of a marriage ending helped to create a downward spiral at my most vulnerable." White agreed, saying, "When shitty lawyers are in a situation like divorce, their goal is to villainize." The former couple reportedly remain on good terms.

On April 8, 2022, White played the national anthem for a Detroit Tigers game, then proposed to his girlfriend, Olivia Jean, near the end of a concert performance at the Detroit Masonic Temple, while "Hotel Yorba" was being played. Jean and White were married shortly afterward by White's business partner Ben Swank who officiated on stage.

Politics 
In October 2016, upon learning that Republican presidential candidate Donald Trump had used the White Stripes song "Seven Nation Army" in video campaign materials, White denounced the presidential candidate and began selling shirts reading "Icky Trump"—a play on the White Stripes song "Icky Thump"—through the Third Man Records website. He publicly endorsed Senator Bernie Sanders for the 2020 Democratic Party presidential primaries and performed a six-song set at a Sanders event at Cass Technical High School on October 27, 2019. At the rally, White stated that he believes that "Sanders is telling the truth, and I really do trust him". He was drawn in by Sanders' view that the Electoral College should be abolished, also stating at the rally that "I have this silly notion that the person who gets the most votes should be elected" and "[the Electoral College] is the reason we're in the mess we're in now".

On November 20, 2022, White wrote a note to Elon Musk explaining his reason for leaving the Twitter platform, he said, "So you gave Trump his Twitter platform back. Absolutely disgusting, Elon. That is officially an asshole move".

Eccentricity 
White has been called "eccentric".
He is known for creating a mythology around his endeavors; examples include his claim that the Stripes began on Bastille Day, that he and Meg are the two youngest of ten siblings, and that Third Man Records used to be a candy factory. These assertions came into question or were disproven, as when, in 2002, the Detroit Free Press produced copies of both a marriage license and divorce certificate for him and Meg, confirming their history as a married couple. Neither addresses the truth officially, and Jack continues to refer to Meg as his sister in interviews, including in the documentary Under Great White Northern Lights, filmed in 2007. In a 2005 interview with Rolling Stone magazine, Jack alluded to this open secret, implying that it was intended to keep the focus on the music rather than the couple's relationship:

When you see a band that is two pieces, husband and wife, boyfriend and girlfriend, you think, 'Oh, I see ... ' When they're brother and sister, you go, 'Oh, that's interesting.' You care more about the music, not the relationship—whether they're trying to save their relationship by being in a band.

He has an attachment to the number three, stemming from seeing three staples in the back of a Vladimir Kagan couch, he helped to upholster as an apprentice. His business ventures frequently feature "three" in the title and he typically appends "III" to the end of his name. During the White Stripes 2005 tour in the UK, White began referring to himself as "Three Quid"—"quid" being British slang for pound sterling.

He maintains an aesthetic that he says challenges whether people will believe he is "real". He frequently color-codes his endeavors, such as the aforementioned Third Man Upholstery and the White Stripes, as well as Third Man Records, which is completely outfitted in yellow, black, red, and blue (including staff uniforms). As a taxidermy enthusiast—that correlates to his work as an upholsterer—he decorates his studio in preserved animals, including a peacock, giraffe, and Himalayan goat.

Minor controversies 
On December 13, 2003, White was involved in an altercation with Jason Stollsteimer, lead singer of the Von Bondies, at the Magic Stick, a Detroit club. White was charged with misdemeanor aggravated assault. He pleaded guilty to the lesser charge of assault and battery, was fined $750 (including court costs), and was sentenced to take anger management classes.

White has repeatedly referenced conflicts that erupted between him and fellow artists in Detroit's underground music scene after the White Stripes gained international success. In a 2006 interview with the Associated Press, he said that he eventually left Detroit because, "he could not take the negativity anymore." However, in an effort to clarify his feelings towards the city of Detroit itself, he wrote and released a poem called "Courageous Dream's Concern". In it, he expresses his affection for his hometown.

During their 2013 divorce proceedings, Elson entered into evidence an e-mail White had sent her that included disparaging remarks about the Black Keys. When asked about the email in a 2014 Rolling Stone magazine interview, White stood by the remarks saying, "I'll hear TV commercials where the music's ripping off sounds of mine, to the point I think it's me. Half the time, it's the Black Keys." He later apologized for the comments. However, in September 2015, Black Keys drummer Patrick Carney posted a series of tweets alleging that White tried to fight him in a bar. White denied the claim in a statement to the online magazine Pitchfork, saying that Carney should talk to him directly, and not on the internet. The following day, Carney posted a tweet saying, "Talked to jack for an hour he's cool. All good." White tweeted on the Third Man Twitter account, "From one musician to another, you have my respect Patrick Carney."

On February 1, 2015, the University of Oklahoma's newspaper OU Daily ran a story regarding White's show of February 2 at McCasland Field House that included the publication of White's tour rider. The rider, especially the guacamole recipe it included and White's ban of bananas backstage, received some media coverage. It was later reported that in response to the rider's publication White's booking agency, William Morris Endeavor Entertainment, had banned its acts from playing shows at the University of Oklahoma. On February 15, White released an open letter addressed to "journalists and other people looking for drama or a diva" in which he referred to the guacamole recipe as his tour manager's "inside joke with local promoters" and "just something to break up the boredom" and the ban of bananas being alluded to food allergies of an unnamed tour member, while criticizing journalists who wrote about the rider as "out of their element". In the same letter he forgave OU Daily for publishing the story and reaffirmed his desire to perform in Oklahoma.

Philanthropy 
White has provided financial support to institutions in his hometown of Detroit. In 2009, White donated almost $170,000 towards the renovation of the baseball diamond in southwest Detroit's Clark Park. The Detroit Masonic Temple was nearly foreclosed on in 2013 after it was revealed that owners owed $142,000 in back taxes. In June 2013, it was revealed that White had footed the entire bill. To thank him for the donation, the temple has decided to rename its second largest theater the Jack White Theater.

The National Recording Preservation Foundation received an inaugural gift of $200,000 from White to use toward restoring and preserving deteriorating sound recordings on media such as reel-to-reel tape and old cylinders. The foundation's director, Eric J. Schwartz said the donation demonstrated a "commitment by a really busy songwriter and performer donating both his time on the board, and money to preserve our national song recording heritage". White also serves on the foundation's board.

In July 2016, White joined Nashville's 45-member Gender Equality Council.

On September 18, 2018, White donated $30,000 to The Outsiders House Museum for its preservation and restoration.

On May 3, 2019, Wayne State University of Detroit, Michigan awarded White with an honorary doctor of humane letters degree "for his dedication to Detroit and significant contributions to the arts as one of the most prolific and renowned artists of the past two decades".

Awards and nominations 

For his various collaborations and solo work, White has won regional, national and international awards, including twelve Grammy Awards and has been nominated for 33. Nashville mayor Karl Dean awarded White the title of "Nashville Music City Ambassador" in 2011.

Back-up band 
Although a solo artist, White performs with a live band to provide additional instrumentation and vocals.

Current lineup 

Dominic Davis – bass, backing vocals
Daru Jones – drums
Quincy McCrary – keyboards, samples, synthesizer, organ, backing vocals

Boarding House Reach-era lineup 

Carla Azar – acoustic drums, percussion, backing vocals
Dominic Davis – bass
Neal Evans – piano, synthesizer, organ, keyboards, electronic drums, backing vocals
Quincy McCrary – keyboards, samples, backing vocals

Lazaretto-era lineup 
Dominic Davis – bass
Dean Fertita – Hammond organ, piano, keyboards
Daru Jones – drums
Fats Kaplin – pedal steel guitar, fiddle, mandolin, theremin
Lillie Mae Rische – fiddle, mandolin, backing vocals

Lazaretto-era previous members 
Isaiah "Ikey" Owens – B3 organ, piano, keyboards 
Cory Younts – mandolin, harmonica, piano, keyboards, percussion, backing vocals

Blunderbuss-era lineup 
Note: While on tour in support of Blunderbuss, White toured with two bands that he alternated between shows with.

The Buzzards (all-male band)
Dominic Davis – bass
Daru Jones – drums
Fats Kaplin – pedal steel guitar, fiddle, mandolin, theremin
Isaiah "Ikey" Owens – B3 organ, piano, keyboards
Cory Younts – mandolin, harmonica, piano, keyboards, percussion, backing vocals

The Peacocks (all-female band)
Ruby Amanfu – backing vocals
Carla Azar – drums
Maggie Bjorklund – pedal steel guitar, acoustic guitar
Catherine Popper – bass
Bryn Davies – bass
Lillie Mae Rische – fiddle, mandolin, backing vocals
Brooke Waggoner – piano, B3 organ, keyboards

Discography 

Solo albums

Blunderbuss (2012)
Lazaretto (2014)
Boarding House Reach (2018)
Fear of the Dawn (2022)
Entering Heaven Alive (2022)

With the White Stripes

 The White Stripes (1999)
 De Stijl (2000)
 White Blood Cells (2001)
 Elephant (2003)
 Get Behind Me Satan (2005)
 Icky Thump (2007)

With the Raconteurs

 Broken Boy Soldiers (2006)
 Consolers of the Lonely (2008)
 Help Us Stranger (2019)

With the Dead Weather

 Horehound (2009)
 Sea of Cowards (2010)
 Dodge and Burn (2015)

Filmography 
The Rosary Murders (1987) – uncredited altar boy
Cold Mountain (2003) – Georgia
Coffee and Cigarettes (2003) – Himself
Under Blackpool Lights (2004) – Himself
The Fearless Freaks (2005) – Himself
Walk Hard: The Dewey Cox Story (2007) – Elvis Presley
Shine a Light (2008) – Himself
It Might Get Loud (2009) – Himself
Mutant Swinger from Mars (2009) – Mikey
Under Great White Northern Lights (2010) – Himself
Conan O'Brien Can't Stop (2011) – Himself
American Pickers (2012) – Himself
Portlandia, season 3, episode 1 (2012) – Himself
The Muppets, season 1, episode 16 (2016) – Himself
American Epic (2017) – Himself
The American Epic Sessions (2017) – Himself
Jack White: Kneeling at The Anthem D.C. (2018) – Himself
Killers of the Flower Moon (2023) 

 Books We Are Going to Be Friends'' (2017) – based on "We're Going to Be Friends" by the White Stripes

Footnotes

Notes

References

Works cited

External links 

Third Man Records
Official site of the White Stripes
Official site of the Raconteurs
Official site of the Dead Weather

 

 
1975 births
American blues guitarists
Alternative rock guitarists
American male singers
American music video directors
American rock guitarists
American rock singers
American male guitarists
American tenors
Cass Technical High School alumni
Wayne State University alumni
Grammy Award winners
Living people
American mandolinists
American marimbists
Slide guitarists
Lead guitarists
The White Stripes members
American people of Polish descent
American people of Scottish descent
American people of Canadian descent
American expatriates in the United Kingdom
20th-century American singers
21st-century American singers
Third Man Records artists
XL Recordings artists
American male drummers
Upholsterers
Guitarists from Detroit
20th-century American drummers
21st-century American drummers
The Dead Weather members
The Raconteurs members